The Nighthawk–Chopaka Border Crossing connects the town of Loomis, Washington and Cawston, British Columbia on the Canada–United States border. Similkameen Road on the American side joins Nighthawk Road on the Canadian side.

Railway
In April 1907, the rail head of the VV&E, a Great Northern Railway subsidiary, advanced westward across the border. A modest train service operated over the following decades.

Canadian side

A customs office existed at Chopaka during the summer of 1861, before relocating to Osoyoos. The next office opened in 1907 for railway traffic but relocated to the Keremeos preventative station the following year. That office closed in 1917 but reopened in 1940. During the earlier years, a Keremeos officer would travel to Chopka to clear any livestock movements across the border. The Similkameen office opened on the rail line a short distance north of the border in 1917 but closed in 1940. This road crossing existed by at least the early 1930s.

US side
The customs office seems to have opened in 1907. For many years, the Nighthawk trail was popular for liquor smuggling during Prohibition in the United States. In 1929, when border patrols and their propensity to fire weapons increased, the smuggling activity moved farther eastward.

Chopaka Road was parallel to the rail line and crossed the border. In 1952, the Nighthawk border station closed. The location of this station is unclear but it may have been back from the border at the Nighthawk settlement to handle both road and rail traffic. The opening date of the existing road border station is unclear, but likely predated the Canadian one. Initially, a trailer at the border housed the inspection services. In 1962, the US built a small brick border station at this site. Around this time, the US installed a locked gate on the Chopaka Road a mile south of the border.

Averaging just 28 vehicles per day in 2009, the crossing was the least used land border in Washington state at the time.

In 2012, a new facility, which employs advanced technologies, replaced the former customs house.

The area west of the station is the most remote part of the contiguous US border, passing through the Cascade Mountains. The next border crossing is  westward at Sumas-Huntingdon Border Crossing. However, many hikers on the Pacific Crest Trail cross between North Cascades National Park and Manning Park without reporting at the nearest official port of entry as legally required.

See also
 List of Canada–United States border crossings

References

Canada–United States border crossings
1907 establishments in British Columbia
1907 establishments in Washington (state)
Buildings and structures in Okanogan County, Washington